Black Sheep of the American Dream is the sixth studio album by American hardcore punk band Death by Stereo, released in April 2012. It is their first album released on Viking Funeral Records.

Track listing

Personnel
 Efrem Schulz – vocals
 Dan Palmer – lead guitar, backing vocals
 JP Gericke – rhythm guitar, backing vocals
 Paul Miner – bass, backing vocals
 Mike Cambra – drums, percussion, backing vocals

References

Death by Stereo albums
2012 albums